Thousand Island Lake is a large alpine lake in the Sierra Nevada, within the Ansel Adams Wilderness in eastern Madera County, California.

The lake is named for the many small rocky islands that dot its surface. Theodore Solomons probably established the 'Thousand Island' name, as this appears on his 1896 map. John Muir called it by "Islet Lake."

Geography
The lake is within the boundaries of the Ansel Adams Wilderness of the Sierra National Forest and Inyo National Forest. Thousand Island Lake sits at the base of Banner Peak in the Ritter Range. It is the source of the Middle Fork of the San Joaquin River, which flows southeast, and then west, into the San Joaquin Valley. The lake is a glacial tarn, formed in the bottom of a cirque when a glacier retreated.

Access
Thousand Island Lake is accessible from several hiking routes:
High Trail or River Trail: from Agnew Meadows trailhead (Inyo National Forest) - on road to Devils Postpile National Monument in Mammoth Lakes area
John Muir Trail
Pacific Crest Trail
Sierra High Route

Culture
The black and white photographs by Ansel Adams made Thousand Island Lake a famous Sierra landmark.

See also

List of lakes in California
Sierra Nevada subalpine zone

References

Lakes of the Sierra Nevada (United States)
Lakes of Madera County, California
Inyo National Forest
Sierra National Forest
San Joaquin River
Lakes of California
Lakes of Northern California